Razaaq Adoti (born 27 June 1973) is a British actor, producer and screenwriter.

Early life
Adoti was born in Forest Gate, London of Nigerian descent (Nigerian British). He landed his first professional screen role on the British television show, Press Gang, playing a police officer. After a season with the National Youth Music Theatre (NYMT) winning the Edinburgh Festival Fringe First Award with Aesop, A New Opera and playing the lead Nathan Detroit in Guys and Dolls, Adoti was accepted into the Central School of Speech and Drama, where he studied for three years and earned his degree in acting.

Career

Actor
Adoti was cast as Yamba in Steven Spielberg’s feature epic, Amistad alongside Anthony Hopkins, Morgan Freeman and Matthew McConaughey.  After completing Amistad, he returned to London where he worked on various television and film projects. This included. Paul McGuigan's Gangster No. 1, and Black Hawk Down with director Ridley Scott, playing the antagonist Yousuf Dahir Mo'alim. Since then, Adoti has starred in numerous productions including  Paul W. S. Anderson’s Resident Evil: Apocalypse, Haven, Doom (based on the popular video game of the same name) and The Hard Corps. Adoti also starred as Dutch Maas in Bill Duke’s 2008 film, Cover.

Producer
Adoti, through his Area Boyz production company, has written a screenplay Sons of the Soil (formerly Area Boyz) to be shot in England and Nigeria.  He is also the host and co-producer on the new Fox Soccer Channel television show titled Extra Time set for a summer 2008 premiere.

Filmography

Film

Television

References

External links

1973 births
Alumni of the Royal Central School of Speech and Drama
English people of Nigerian descent
English male film actors
English male television actors
Black British male actors
Living people
Male actors from London
People from Forest Gate
Nigerian screenwriters